Coccothrinax jamaicensis, the silver thatch or Jamaican silver thatch, is a fan palm believed to be endemic to  Jamaica.

Description
The undersides of the leaves are silvery in colour due to a dense scaly layer. The flowers are whitish and strongly scented.

Taxonomy
The genus Coccothrinax is considered "taxonomically difficult", and in need of a complete taxonomic treatment. Its diversity is primarily in the Greater Antilles—most species are found in Cuba which has 39 species, or Hispaniola, with 11. Unlike its Greater Antillean neighbours, Jamaica supports only a single species, C. jamaicensis. While the species has been reported from Providencia and Swan Island in the western Caribbean, Jestrow and colleagues consider these reports to be in need of validation, and consider the species to be a Jamaican endemic as does the World Checklist of Selected Plant Families.

Jamaican Coccothrinax were originally placed in C. argentata, but American botanist Liberty Hyde Bailey transferred them to C. fragrans. American botanist Robert W. Read concluded that Jamaican Coccothrinax, while variable, did not fit into either species, and described a new species, C. jamaicensis, to include the species. Andrew Henderson and colleagues (1995) considered C. jamaicensis to be a synonym of C. argentata, but Rafaël Govaerts accepted it as a valid species, as did systematists working on Caribbean palms.

Habitat
It is a typical component of dry limestone forests.

Uses
The leaves of C. jamaicaensis are used to weave hats, baskets, bags and brooms.

References

jamaicensis
Trees of Jamaica
Plants described in 1966